Sandra D. Knight is a retired American actress.

Acting career

Film
Knight acted in low-budget films of the 1950s and 1960s, such as Frankenstein's Daughter (1958) in which she played the titular role, The Terror (1963) starring Boris Karloff and Jack Nicholson, where she plays an evil spirit, and Tower of London (1962) with Vincent Price. Her most well-known film is the bootleg moonshine action epic Thunder Road (1958) starring Robert Mitchum.

Television
She appeared as a guest star in numerous television series, including the episode "The Legacy" in the Western Tales of Wells Fargo , an episode of the science fiction anthology series One Step Beyond called "The Burning Girl"; an episode titled "Knock on Any Tombstone" of the Warner Bros. detective show Bourbon Street Beat; the episode "The Search for Cope Borden" in the Western  The Man from Blackhawk; the episode "Home Town", in the Western Tate; the Western The Rebel; the episodes "Drifter's Gold" and "The Last Journey" in the Western Laramie; the Western Wagon Train in the episode "The Bettina May Story"; the episode "Separate Checks" in the detective show Surfside 6; the episode "A Time to Run" of the Western The Tall Man; and the episode "The Yellow Badge of Courage" in the sitcom I'm Dickens, He's Fenster.

Personal life
In 1962, Knight married fellow actor Jack Nicholson, with whom she had worked on The Terror. They have a daughter, Jennifer. Knight retired from acting in 1966. Knight and Nicholson divorced in 1968, and she married John Arthur Stephenson in 1982.

Selected filmography

Film
 Thunder Road (1958)
 Frankenstein's Daughter (1958)
 Tower of London (1962)
 The Terror (1963)
 Blood Bath (1966)

Television
 State Trooper (1958)
 Tales of Wells Fargo (1958)
 One Step Beyond (1959)
 Bourbon Street Beat (1960)
 Goodyear Theatre (1960)
 The Man from Blackhawk (1960)
 Tate (1960)
 The Rebel (1960-1961)
 Laramie (1960-1961)
 Wagon Train (1961)
 Surfside 6 (1961)
 The Tall Man (1962)
 I'm Dickens, He's Fenster (1962)

References

External links
 Official website
 

20th-century American actresses
Actresses from Pennsylvania
American film actresses
American television actresses
Living people
21st-century American women
Year of birth missing (living people)